OFK Dunajská Lužná is a Slovak football team, based in the town of Dunajská Lužná. The club was founded in 1921.

History
From the club's establishment in 1921, they played in various regional competitions. In 2015 they were promoted to the Slovak Second Division.

Events timeline
 1921 – Founded as FC Schildern
 1946 – Renamed to Jánošík Schilnder
 1950s – Renamed to Jánošíková-Koširiská
 2006 – Renamed to OFK Dunajská Lužná

Current squad 
As of 12 September 2015

Notable managers 
  Ivan Vrabec (2011-2013)
  Peter Fieber (2015-2016)
  Ivan Vrabec (2016-2017)
  Karol Brezík (2017-2020)
  Jozef Nespešný (2020)
  Marián Janšák (2020-2022)
  Martin Vadovič (2022-)

References

External links 
  
 

Dunajska Luzna
Association football clubs established in 1921
1921 establishments in Slovakia